Los Andes is an Argentine daily newspaper published in the city of Mendoza. The newspaper was founded in 1883 by Adolfo Calle. It is not related to the Los Andes newspaper in Peru.

In September 1995, it became the first Argentine newspaper to become available on the internet.

References

External links
 Los Andes official website

Spanish-language newspapers
Daily newspapers published in Argentina
Publications established in 1883
Mendoza Province
Clarín Group